The Romeo Block, located at 2944 Zuni St. in Denver, Colorado, was built in 1889.  It was listed on the National Register of Historic Places in 1996.

It was designed in 1889 by the Baerresen Brothers, Harold and Viggio, for use by five storefronts on the street level, as a rooming house on the second floor, and possibly also as a blacksmith shop in the basement.

References

		
National Register of Historic Places in Denver
Buildings and structures completed in 1889
Buildings and structures in Denver
Blacksmith shops